The Americans are a roots rock band from Los Angeles, California.

History 
The Americans formed in 2010. They have appeared on The Late Show (CBS) and on the TV series American Epic (PBS/BBC). Their music was featured in the films Texas Killing Fields, A Country Called Home, and Little Glory, and the TV series No Tomorrow (CW). In 2015 they backed up Nick Cave, Lucinda Williams, and Courtney Love at the 60th anniversary celebration of Allen Ginsberg's Howl. The band's debut album, I'll Be Yours, released July 7, 2017 on Loose Music, debuted at #15 on the UK Americana Top 40 and #19 on the Indie Breaker's chart. Stand True, the band's second album, released on Loose Music on May 6, 2022, debuted at #25 on the Official Americana Albums Chart Top 40.

Band members 

 Patrick Ferris — vocals, guitar
 Zac Sokolow — guitar
 Jake Faulkner — bass

Discography 

 Stand True (2022), Loose Music
 I'll Be Yours (2017), Loose Music
 First Recordings EP (2016)
 Son of Rogue's Gallery (2013), Anti- compilation
 Home Recordings EP (2012)
 The Americans EP (2010)

References

External links 

 Official website
 Facebook
 Instagram
 Twitter
 YouTube
 Spotify
 Apple Music

Musical groups from Los Angeles
Roots rock music groups
Musical groups established in 2010
2010 establishments in California